The Ottoman Empire, which began as an Anatolian beylik and became an empire through expansion, has been known historically by different names at different periods and in various languages. This page surveys the history of these names and their usage.

In different languages
 Medieval Latin: Turchia (Turkey) or Imperium Turcicum (Turkish Empire)
 English: Ottoman Empire, Osmanic Empire, Osmanian Empire, Ottoman Turkey, Turkish Empire
 Ottoman Turkish:  Devlet-i Alîye-i Osmânîye (The Sublime Ottoman State)
 Ottoman Turkish: Devlet-i Âlîye (The Exalted State)
 Ottoman Turkish: Devlet-i Ebed-Müddet (The Eternal State)
 Ottoman Turkish: Memâlik-i Mahrûse (The Well-Protected Domains)
 Ottoman Turkish: Memâlik-i Mahrûse-i Osmanîye (The Well-Protected Domains of the Ottomans)
 Modern Turkish:  (Ottoman Empire),  (Ottoman State), Osmanlı Türkiyesi (Ottoman Turkey)
 Azerbaijani:  (Ottoman Empire),  (Ottoman State)
 Albanian: Perandoria Osmane (occasionally but very seldom "Otomane")
 Arabic:  Ad-Daulatu' l-ʿAliyatu' l-ʿUṯmāniyya (The Sublime Ottoman State) or  Ad-Daulatu' l-ʿUṯmāniyya
 Aromanian: Imperiul Otoman
 Armenian: Օսմանյան Կայսրություն (Osmanyan Kaysroutyoun)
 Bosnian, Croatian, Serbian:  (Osmansko Carstvo) /  (Otomansko Carstvo) / Османлијско царство (Osmanlijsko carstvo) / Турска (Turska) / Турско царство (Tursko carstvo)
 Bulgarian:  (Osmanska Imperia)
 Chinese: Lumi (魯迷) (originates from Rûm or Rumi.), or Rumu 如木 (originates from Rûm or Rumi.), or Du'erge 度爾格 (from Turkey), Tuliyesike 圖里耶斯科 (from Turkey), or Du'erke 都兒克 (from Turkey), or Du'erjia 都爾佳 (from Turkey), or Tuliya 圖里雅 (from Turkey), or Tu'erqi 土耳其 (from Turkey), or Hongke'er 烘克爾 (from Mongolian Khungghar), Gongka'er 供喀爾 (from Mongolian Khungghar), Hongke'er 烘克爾 (from Mongolian Khungghar), or Hongga'er 紅噶爾 (from Mongolian Khungghar), or Kongka'er 孔喀爾 (from Mongolian Khungghar), or Kongka'er 空喀爾 (from Mongolian Khungghar), or Konggu'er 空谷爾 (from Mongolian Khungghar)
 Danish: Det Osmanske Rige (the Ottoman realm)
 , informally, Τουρκιά (Tourkiâ)
 
 German: Osmanisches Reich (or Türkisches Reich)
 Hungarian: Oszmán Birodalom (Osman Empire)
 Macedonian: Отоманска Империја (Otomanska Imperija) or Османлиска Империја (Osmanliska Imperija)
 Mongolian: Khungghar (derives from Ottoman word hunkār)
 
Polish: "Imperium Osmańskie" (the Osman Empire), "Turcja Osmańska" (Osman Turkey) unofficially "Turcja" (Turkey)
Romanian: "Imperiul Otoman" (the Ottoman Empire), sometimes "Poarta Otomană" (the Ottoman Gate)
 Swedish: Osmanska riket (the Ottoman realm)
 Serbo-Croatian: Osmansko Carstvo/Osmanlijsko Carstvo (The Ottoman Empire); Tursko Carstvo (Turkish Empire)
 French: Empire ottoman
Ukrainian: Османська Імперія (Osmans'ka Imperiya)
In diplomatic circles, the Ottoman government was often referred to as the "Porte" or the "Sublime Porte," a literal translation of the Ottoman Turkish Bâb-ı Âlî, which was the only gate of Topkapı Palace open to foreigners and the location where the Sultan and his viziers greeted ambassadors.

References

External links

Historic maps using the alternative names of the Ottoman Empire
Historic map by John Bartholomew & Co.: Changes in Turkey in Europe, 1856 to 1878
Map of Turkey in Europe and Hungary in the 17th century, engraved by J. Russell, published in Barclay's Universal Dictionary, 1823
Map of Turkey in Europe and Hungary in the 17th century, engraved by J. Barlow, published by Brightly & Kinnersley in the Rev. E. Blomfield's A Complete and Universal Dictionary, 1812
Map of Turkey in Europe and Hungary, drawn and engraved by Sidney Hall, published in the General Atlas of Ancient and Modern Geography, 1827
Map of Turkey in Europe by J. Rapkin, published by J & F Tallis, London, Edinburgh & Dublin, c.1851
Map of Turkey in Europe by Sidney Hall, printed in colours by Fr. Schenck, Edinburgh and published by A & C Black, c.1856
Map of Turkey in Europe by J. Wyld, engraved by N.R. Hewitt and published in Edinburgh by John Thompson & Co., c.1823
Map of Turkey in Europe engraved by A. Findlay and published by Thomas Kelly in A New and Complete System of Universal Geography, 1818
Map of Turkey in Europe by John Archer, published in The National Encyclopedia Atlas, 1868
Map of Turkey in Europe by Keith Johnston. Published in Keith Johnston's The Royal Atlas of Modern Geography, 1861
Map of Turkey in Asia engraved by John Archer, published in The College Atlas, c.1850
Map of Turkey in Asia by J. Bartholomew, published in Philips' Imperial Library Atlas (edited by William Hughes), London, 1864
Map of Turkey in Asia (Asia Minor) and Transcaucasia" by Keith Johnston, published in Keith Johnston's The Royal Atlas of Modern Geography, 1861
Map of Turkey in Asia engraved by J. Russell, published in Barclay's Universal Dictionary, 1823
Map of Turkey in Asia engraved by Sidney Hall and published in Black's General Atlas, Edinburgh, 1846
Map of Turkey in Asia in Kelly's New System of Universal Geography, 1828
Map of Turkey in Asia published in Cooke's Geography, 1817
Map of the Turkish Empire (Imperium Turcicum in Europa, Asia et Africa; regiones proprias, tributarias, clientelares) by Johann Baptiste Homann, Nuremberg, 1737
Map of the Turkish Empire in Europe and Asia, published by Letts, London, 1883
Map of the Turkish Empire in Europe and Asia, by George Cram, Chicago, 1892
Map of the Turkish Empire (Natoliam, Turcia Turcicive Imperii) published by De Jode, c.1590
Map of the Turkish Empire (Imperium Turcicum complectens Europae, Asiae et Africae) by P. Schenk, Amsterdam, c. 1720
Map of the Turkish Empire (Turcicum Imperium) by Jodocus Hondius, 1607. Published in English by Michael Sparke, London, 1635
Map of the Turkish Empire (1844)
Turcicum Imperium
Turcicum Imperium

History of the Ottoman Empire
Ottoman Empire